Kodavere is a village in Peipsiääre Parish, Tartu County, Estonia. It lies on the shore of Lake Peipus.

References

 

Villages in Tartu County
Kreis Dorpat